Julian Victor Corrie (born 20 June 1985), better known by his stage name Miaoux Miaoux, is an English producer, musician and songwriter based in Glasgow, Scotland. He is signed to Chemikal Underground Records, who have released his albums Light of the North and School of Velocity. Prior to his solo career Corrie was a member of the Glasgow-based band Maple Leaves.

Corrie is currently a member of Scottish indie rock band Franz Ferdinand and has created remixes for Chvrches, Belle & Sebastian and Lindstrom, amongst others. Corrie plays all the instruments on recordings himself, and performs live with drummer Liam Chapman (Prehistoric Friends, Quickbeam, Friends in America) and bassist Liam Graham.

Early life and education
Corrie was born in Nottingham, England. He spent his early childhood in Peru, where his father worked. Corrie studied the piano from a young age, and was introduced by his older brother to sample-based music, including Portishead and the Propellerheads. He completed the Tonmeister degree at the University of Surrey.

Career
After graduation, Corrie took up a placement at BBC Scotland in Glasgow, where he worked as a sound engineer until 2016.

Light of the North was recorded and produced by Corrie himself, and mixed by Paul Savage at Chem 19 Recording Studios. It was nominated for the Scottish Album of the Year Award in 2013. The album artwork is by James Houston, a frequent collaborator of Corrie's, particularly in Polybius, a short for Channel 4's Random Acts, which Houston directed. Corrie produced the single "I.D.L.U" by Bdy_Prts, a project by Jill O'Sullivan of Sparrow and the Workshop and Jenny Reeve of Strike the Colours which was released on 3 March 2014. He has worked alongside comedian Robert Florence, producing tracks for the television show Burnistoun.  Florence's production company, Bold Yin Productions, also produced award-winning artist Rachel Maclean's short Germs for Channel 4, for which Corrie provided music and sound design. Corrie has continued to work on further projects with Rachel Maclean as well as the National Theatre of Scotland.

The album was favourably reviewed by Drowned in Sound, The Scotsman, The Skinny, The Line Of Best Fit, and The List.

On 19 May 2017, it was announced that Corrie had joined Franz Ferdinand along with fellow new member Dino Bardot as the band's new keyboard and synthesizer player.

Discography

as Miaoux Miaoux

Albums
Rainbow Bubbles, released 20 August 2007, Koshka Records
Light of the North, released 8 June 2012, Chemikal Underground Records
School of Velocity, released June 2015

EPs
Blooms, released 16 March 2010, Test Pilot Music Ltd
The Japanese War Effort/Fox Gut Daata/Miaoux Miaoux/Wounded Knee Split EP, released 6 December 2010, Gerry Loves Records
Autopilot, released 12 October 2012, Chemikal Underground Records

Singles
"Hey Sound", released 23 May 2011, Eli and Oz
"Better for Now", released 15 June 2012, Chemikal Underground Records

With Franz Ferdinand

Albums
Always Ascending, released 9 February 2018, Domino Recording Company

With Maple Leaves

EPs
Kirsty/Easyspeak, released 9 July 2009 
Tapestry, released 2 June 2010
Golden Ether, released 20 October 2010, Bubblegum Records
Threads, released 14 February 2011 (includes tracks remixed by Miaoux Miaoux)
Robots, released 27 May 2012

Remixes
Arab Strap, The First Big Weekend of 2016
Chvrches, The Mother We Share, The Mother We Share (single), released 13 September 2013 (vinyl only), National Anthem Records
Belle & Sebastian, Your Cover's Blown, The Third Eye Centre (album), released 26 August 2013, Rough Trade
Panamah, Born Af Natten, Sounds of Copenhagen Volume 11 (compilation album), released 19 August 2013, Good Tape Records
 I am Dive, The Cliff, Driftwood (album), released 16 June 2013, Foehn Records
Chopin, 2 Nocturnes op.55: no.1 in F minor, Variations of Chopin (remix compilation album), released 13 May 2013, too many fireworks records
Lindstrom, Rà-àkõ-st, promotional release for Smalhans (album) released 17 October 2012, The Quietus
Human Don't Be Angry, 1985, 1985 (single), released 18 May 2012, Chemikal Underground Records
 Discopolis, Zenithobia, Zenithobia (Remixes) (EP), released 5 March 2012, KIDS Records
Adam Stafford, Shot-down You Summer Wannabes, Fire & Theft (single), released 22 August 2011, Wise Blood Industries
Futuristic Retro Champions, May The Forth, Love and Lemonade (album), released 4 April 2011, Everything Flows
 Japanese War Effort, Ribbit, The Japanese War Effort/Fox Gut Daata/Miaoux Miaoux/Wounded Knee Split EP (EP), released 6 December 2010, Gerry Loves Records
Zoey Van Goey, Song to the Embers, Foxtrot Vandals (single), released 15 October 2007, Zoey Van Goey

References

External links
Soundcloud Page
Twitter Page
Facebook Page
Chemikal Underground Records
National Theatre of Scotland
Maple Leaves Bandcamp

Franz Ferdinand (band) members
1985 births
Living people
Alumni of the University of Surrey